The 2017 season of Dhangadhi Premier League was the debut season of the Dhangadhi Premier League. The tournament featured six teams. The season began on 9 April 2017 with the final match being held on 22 April 2017.

The tournament was won by Team Chauraha Dhangadhi, who defeated Biratnagar Kings in the final. Sushil Kandel of Biratnagar Kings was declared the player of the tournament.

Venue

Teams and squads

Charity match

Format

Points table 

 As of 22 April 2017
 The four top ranked teams will qualify for the playoffs
  advanced to Qualifier 1
  advanced to the Eliminator
Source: ESPNcricinfo

League progression

League matches

Playoff stage

Preliminary

Qualifier 1

Eliminator

Qualifier 2

Final

Statistics

Most runs 

Source: ESPNcricinfo, 22 April 2017

Most wickets 

Source: ESPNcricinfo, 22 April 2017

See also
2017 Everest Premier League

References

2017 in Nepalese cricket
Dhangadhi Premier League